The Last Podcast on the Left is a weekly podcast on the Last Podcast Network featuring comedian and podcast host Ben Kissel, podcast producer and researcher Marcus Parks, and comedian and actor Henry Zebrowski, all of whom are longtime friends. Episodes have explored the topics of serial killers, conspiracy theories, UFO sightings, ghosts, cryptids, the occult, and readings of fan-submitted creepypastas. The name is a reference to the 1972 horror movie The Last House on the Left.

Premise 
Episodes explore real and imagined horror, with a typical runtime of one to two hours. The show releases two episodes weekly, a main episode and a side story episode. 

Hosted by Ben Kissel, Marcus Parks, and comedian and actor Henry Zebrowski

The opening theme of the podcast features snippets from serial killers, such as Jeffrey Dahmer who utters the line, "That's when the cannibalism started." It also includes the line and subsequent advertisement transition "Rise from your grave!" uttered by Zeus from the Sega action game Altered Beast. The closing theme is Al Bowlly's "Midnight, the Stars and You", a reference to The Shining.

Several repeat characters are present on the podcast (primarily voiced by Zebrowski) such as "Detective Popcorn" (the semi-erotic food-focused and incompetent police detective); Charles Ng (a notorious serial killer); "Terry the Gnome", "The Bone-Slicer"; and Minnie and Nannie Williams (victims of serial killer H. H. Holmes).

History 
The podcast was launched in 2011. “Last Podcast on the Left” began in 2011 as a conversation between friends who love horror movies. The name was inspired by horror movie “The Last House on the Left.” The podcast's discussions, hosted by Ben Kissel, Marcus Parks and Zebrowski have delved into topics including aliens, cryptids and other macabre topics. 

In 2017, The Last Podcast on the Left received the People's Voice Webby in the Podcasts & Digital Audio (Comedy) category.

In 2018, they filmed their first live show at Thalia Hall in Chicago, IL. In 2019, they filmed their second live show in New Orleans, LA. The hosts have toured extensively in the US and internationally for live events.

On November 19, 2019, it was announced that the show was moving exclusively to Spotify for ad-sponsored episodes. This arrangement was short-lived, ending in October 2021.

In 2020, Houghton Mifflin Harcourt released The Last Book on the Left, written by Kissel, Parks, and Zebrowski, and illustrated by Tom Neely.
 The book debuted at number three on the New York Times Bestseller List under Hardcover nonfiction.

Last Stream on the Left 

The Last Stream on the Left was a spin-off show hosted on the Adult Swim website. The episodes typically consist of commentary of a selection of videos found by the hosts. There are currently 8 seasons and a total of 145 episodes available on the Adult Swim website. The program was moved to the show's Patreon page after the closure of the Adult Swim streaming platform, with the video uploaded to their YouTube account after the live episode airs. The live stream show aired its final episode on February 18, 2022. The episode was uploaded the next day but subsequently removed by YouTube due to content. An edited version was uploaded March 8th, 2022.

Soul Plumber 

Soul Plumber is a DC horror comic which includes adaptions of Last Podcast on the Left hosts Ben Kissel, Marcus Parks and Henry Zebrowski. The hosts worked with artist John McCrea of DC Comics on the project. The plot follows Edgar Wiggins, a former seminary student who works at a gas station. Wiggin's left seminary school in disgrace but joins a group called the Soul Plumbers out of the desire to continue saving souls. The comic is a six-issue series.

Open Lines 

Open Lines is a live radio talk show available exclusively on Sirius XM's, Faction Talk. The show consists of listeners calling in to tell personal accounts on a previously established topic. Topics are usually related to themes covered in the podcast such as paranormal encounters, cryptozoology, and true crime. The weekly live show airs on Monday's at 7pm ET and listeners can participate by calling 855-355-4741.

Side Stories: Excerpts 

Side Stories: Excerpts is a short video series hosted on YouTube. As the name suggests, the videos consist of short excerpts of the full-length Patreon exclusive video. The first Side Stories video recording of their March 8, 2022, episode was uploaded on March 11, 2022. The full-length Patreon exclusive video is uploaded every Wednesday, and the 10-minute YouTube excerpt episodes are uploaded on Fridays.

Episodes

See also 
 Horror podcast
 List of American crime podcasts

Footnotes
"Why ‘Last Podcast on the Left’ will no longer be a Spotify exclusive". The Los Angeles Times

References

External links
 

Comedy and humor podcasts
Audio podcasts
Non-fiction works about serial killers
Crime podcasts
2011 podcast debuts
Horror podcasts
Patreon creators
American podcasts